Love Lessons is a British novel intended for older readers by Jacqueline Wilson, first published by Doubleday in 2005. It is illustrated by Nick Sharratt, although the only illustrations in this book are the chapter-headings.

Some of the characters in Love Lessons are similar to those in one of the author's previous books, Waiting for the Sky to Fall (1983).

Plot summary

The story revolves around a girl called Prudence "Prue" King who lives with her bossy, often scary dad who loses his temper very easily, a sweet yet pressured mother and an immature but kindhearted younger sister, Grace. Her dad is very temperamental and he gets mad on silly things like art classes for Prue and he thinks going to school is an absurd idea. He insists on educating Prue and Grace himself while running a not so successful book shop. One day a man called Mr Miles from the education system comes and tells Prue's father that Prue will have to go to school so she can get her GCSEs. After much grumbling her father reluctantly decides to send her to Maths tuition but not to school. After the class, Prue gives up and skives from her classes, while spending £60.00 in tuition fees on treats including lingerie. When her father finds this out it brings on a stroke. During the time her father is recovering from the stroke, the girls’ mother decides to send them to the nearest public school, Wentworth High, while still keeping it a secret from their sick father.

Prue and Grace go to their new school and find it a slightly scary place. Prue meets the school art teacher, Mr Raxberry ("Rax" as everyone calls him) and develops a crush on him. Prue tries to be confident but Grace shows that she is scared. The girls give admission exams but while Grace finds most questions easy, Prue panics as she thinks the easy questions are trick questions and cannot do the hard ones. She writes an essay in hope that it will be counted as good intelligence. Grace passes with flying colours while Prue does not get a good score and is sent in the class where "dumb kids" are put. She finds it a struggle and is very unhappy. Grace on the other hand is very happy and makes new friends, Jean Igloo and Fiona Harrison, who nicknamed themselves as Iggy and Figgy respectively; Grace calls herself Piggy. The next day is also difficult for Prue as there are PE lessons and she has to change with the other girls; they see Prue's lacy knickers and bra and start calling her a 'slag', but she has Rax's art lessons to look forward to. She enjoys it immensely and Rax even tells her that 'You’re going to be the girl that makes my teaching worthwhile'.

A boy called Toby Baker likes Prue, although the feeling is not mutual and Toby's girlfriend, Rita Rogers, a pretty but mean girl, is very jealous of them. Prue helps Toby with his reading as he is dyslexic and continues to visit her father, who is being extremely uncooperative in trying to recover his speaking skills, on a regular basis. Meanwhile, Rita finds out that Prue has seen Toby. Thinking Prue's time with him is Prue going after him and being the reason Toby dumped her, Prue and Rita fight, before Ms Wilmott comes over and breaks them up. Prue finds out while talking to Rax that he is married to a blonde woman who had been his childhood sweetheart and has a son and daughter, Harry and Lily respectively. Soon Prue and Rax's relationship starts to develop and they share the 10 minutes of peace they have without anyone in the way, to talk and laugh, every time in the car journey to Prue's house, as Prue starts to babysit for Rax's children to earn money to pay for school uniform. After having an argument with Rax, Prue confronts him and asks if he loves her, he then confesses that he does and cannot stop fantasising about her but says that he cannot risk his marriage and his job. She then kisses Rax, who at first pulls away but Prue is persistent and kisses him again and soon Rax begins to kiss Prue back. Afraid they will be spotted Rax drives off to a place he used to go to with his wife when they were young, they talk and continue kissing. However, when she arrives back home Prue's dad has come home, he finds out about their going to school but cannot do much because of his still stiff position. Afraid that he will ban her and Grace from going back to school and therefore not seeing Rax any more, she confides her troubles to Rax, who is really agitated about them being seen together and asks her to calm down. Finally he hugs her trying to calm her but then another student named Sarah spots Prue hugging Rax and telling him that she loves him. Sarah then proceeds to tell everyone else about the incident in an English class where Ms Godfrey asks them to name some modern-day versions of Romeo and Juliet; Rita angrily comes out with 'Prue and Toby' before Sarah says, 'No. Prue and Rax'. The end consists of Ms Wilmott, the head teacher of the school, expelling Prue. Rax comes and says goodbye to Prue for the last time, and they briefly consider running off together. Later, with the help of Toby, Prue's family discovers a set of valuable antique books and sells them to pay off their heavy debts. Prue is sent to Kingtown High School while Rax gets to keep his job.

Characters

Prudence 'Prue' Charity King  - A fourteen-year-old girl who is homeschooled by her father. She is rather artistic but is not very good at maths. Prudence wants to go to art college but her father does not allow her. However, she spends all her pocket money on sketchbooks, soft pencils and coloured crayons in hope of becoming a professional artist. Her father later sent her to maths classes with Miss Roberts, but after the first lesson, Prue did poorly and hated it there. She gives up and skives from her classes, spending £60.00 in the process on chocolate which she later shares with Grace, magazines, food from McDonald's, art materials and some expensive lingerie. Prue's father finds out and gets so worked up about it that he has a stroke and has to leave for the hospital immediately. After much thinking over, the girls’ mother decides to send them to the nearest public school, Wentworth High, while still keeping it a secret from their father. In her art classes, Prue gets a crush on her art teacher, Rax. She grows closer to him, especially when he invites her to babysit for him, which she accepts. The last time she babysits, she confronts Rax about her love for him, and they kiss. After her father finds out they are going to school, Prue goes to Rax, upset and distraught that her father might stop her going. Sarah walks in and sees Prue hugging Rax and telling him she loves him. Sarah comes out about Prue and Rax's affair during an English lesson about Romeo and Juliet, discussing modern day versions of the couple. Ms Godfrey contacts Ms Wilmot, who sees Sarah and then Prue, whom she expels. After her last session in the Success Maker, Prue is met by Grace, who tells her what she has heard. Prue tells her that she has been expelled. Rax is waiting for her in his car. They drive off, and although Prue begs to go with him, they say goodbye and Rax drives to her house, before she leaves him.

Grace Patience King - Prue's eleven-year-old younger sister. Grace is kindhearted, tubby and childish. She adapts well to the school environment and quickly makes friends. As soon as they go into Wentworth, Grace and Prudence start to grow apart and have a row in the middle of the book. They seem to make up at the end of the book.

Keith 'Rax' Raxberry - The art teacher who teaches at Wentworth. He is friendly to Prue and Grace as soon as they go into the school and at the end of day he almost ran over Prue with his car but is incredibly kind and casual; not really fussing about it. After seeing Prudence's work during the Tuesday art lesson he says she is going to be the pupil who will make his teaching worthwhile. Mr. Raxberry and Prue become close friends and he invites her to babysit for his children, a four-year-old son Harry and his six-month-old daughter Lily. She does because she wants to start earning money for the family who is currently in debt and cannot afford the school uniform but also because she likes Rax. The relationship between Mr. Raxberry and Prue begins to heavily develop. She is in love with him, even though he has a wife and children, and the two of them kiss in the car after Prudence's last night of babysitting at Rax's house.

Toby Baker -  A popular boy in Prudence's year and Rita's former boyfriend. Toby is handsome with floppy blonde hair. He has sweet manners and charms Prudence's mother into letting him take Prue out for the day. Toby is said to be worshipped around the school, with several admirers in various other years. It is discovered, around halfway through the book that Toby is in love with Prudence and tries to kiss her when they are smoking behind the bike sheds. He is dyslexic, and gets Prue to help him with his reading. Rita finds out after Aimee sees them sitting talking in McDonald's, and Toby dumps Rita shortly afterwards.

Mrs. King - Prue and Grace's mother.

Bernard King - Prue and Grace's short tempered father. He has a stroke at the start of the book and spends the majority of the book in hospital.

Rita Rogers - Toby's former girlfriend, at the start of the book, but he later dumps her for Prue, although Prue is not interested. She is pretty but mean, with thick outlined eyes and carefully curled dark hair. She often teases and is cruel to Prue, and this is made worse after Toby dumps her, as Rita, angry at Prue, also blames her for it.

Marianne Raxberry - Rax's wife and the mother of Harry and Lily. She often gets irritated with Rax.

Jean 'Iggy' Igloo' and Fiona 'Figgy' Harrison - Grace's new friends who irritate Prue. Figgy and Iggy have a secret club and let Grace join it, letting her in on an irritating double waved hand shake. Grace gives herself the nickname 'Piggy' when she joins their club.

Nurse Ray  - A kind and cheerful nurse who helps Bernard King at the hospital. She is described as fat with brown skin and long dark hair in a plait. 

Harry Raxberry and Lily Raxberry- Rax's four year old son and baby daughter. Prue babysits them.

Ms Wilmott - The head teacher at Wentworth.

Mrs. Godfrey -  The English teacher at Wentworth who is constantly irritated at Prudence.

Gina - Ms Wilmott's secretary. It is implied that she has a crush on Rax, as she is seen looking at him wistfully.

Sarah - A friendly girl with learning difficulties who is in Prudence's form. Her favourite colour is red, and she gets on very well with Rax.

Aimee, Megan and Jess - Rita's friends.

Daisy - A 'lumpy' girl who is in Prudence's form.

Mrs. Peters - The P.E teacher at Wentworth. She is one of the few teachers who is friendly towards Prue. She knows Latin.

Eve Lambert - Prue's form teacher.

Mr. Evans - Mr Evans is one of the teachers at the Success Maker. He is seen trying to teach two foreign boys English.

Controversy/Criticism 
The story has been heavily criticized over complaints the story was deemed "inappropriate" for pre-teens due to the large age difference between Prue and Rax and their teacherxstudent "romance". It is often mentioned that this book encourages unhealthy relationships between teachers and students. In real life, this is also a sign of child abuse.

External links
 'Love at school rings no bells' Review by Stephanie Merritt, The Observer, Sunday 11 December 2005.

2005 British novels
British children's novels
Novels by Jacqueline Wilson
2005 children's books
Doubleday (publisher) books